Ernest Hausmann (born August 20, 2003) is an American football linebacker for Michigan. A native of Uganda, he played college football for Nebraska in 2022 and entered the NCAA transfer portal after the 2022 season.

Early years and high school career
Hausmann was born in Uganda in 2003. His parents, Olive and Paul, were poor, suffered from AIDS, and had 12 to 15 children. They decided to allow an American couple, Robert and Teresa Hausmann, to adopt Ernest. After a two-year adoption and immigration process, Ernest joined the Hausmanns in Nebraska at age five in 2008.

Hausmann grew up in Columbus, Nebraska, and attended Columbus High School. He played football on both offense as a wide receiver and on defense as a cornerback and linebacker. As a senior, he tallied 80 tackles on defense and 600 receiving yards and nine touchdowns.

College football

Nebraska
Hausmann received a scholarship offer from Nebraska in November 2020. He signed his commitment to Nebraska in December 2021.

Hausmann enrolled early at Nebraska in January 2022 and received significant playing time as a true freshman for theteam. He appeared in every game for Nebraska, including seven games as a starter. Against Michigan on November 12, he registered 10 tackles and his first college sack to push the Wolverines out of field goal range in the third quarter.  The following week, on November 19, he had a career-high 12 tackles against Wisconsin. After the 2022 season, Hausmann entered the NCAA transfer portal where he was rated by 247Sports as the top player in the portal.

Michigan
In late December 2022, Hausmann committed to play in 2023 for the Michigan Wolverines football team.

References

External links
 Nebraska profile

2003 births
Living people
American football linebackers
Michigan Wolverines football players
Nebraska Cornhuskers football players
People from Columbus, Nebraska
Players of American football from Nebraska
Ugandan players of American football